The Estadio La Fuensanta is a multi-use stadium located in Cuenca, Castile-La Mancha, Spain. 
It is currently used for football matches and is the home stadium of UB Conquense.

History 
The Fuensata was opened in the 1940s, and UB Conquense began to play home games here since its foundation in 1946. With the promotion of Conquense to Segunda B in the 1997-98 season, the stadium didn't meet the needs of the club.

References

External links
Conquense profile on Futbolme 
Estadios de España 

Football venues in Castilla–La Mancha
UB Conquense
Buildings and structures in Cuenca, Spain
Sports venues completed in 1940
Sport in Cuenca, Spain